Log Run is VIC-20 game written by Mark Brennand and published in 1983 by Terminal Software.  Log Run is a clone of the Century Electronics arcade game Logger, which itself is a version of Donkey Kong with the title character replaced by a bird.

References

External links

1983 video games
VIC-20 games
VIC-20-only games
Video game clones
Video games developed in the United Kingdom
Terminal Software games